Oliveto Lario is a comune (municipality) in the Province of Lecco in the Italian region Lombardy, located about  north of Milan and about  northwest of Lecco.

Oliveto Lario borders the following municipalities: Abbadia Lariana, Barni, Bellagio, Civenna, Lasnigo, Lierna, Magreglio, Mandello del Lario, Valbrona, Varenna.

Twin towns
Oliveto Lario is twinned with:

  Friedberg, Hesse, Germany

References

External links
 Official website

Cities and towns in Lombardy